Demos and Live Cuts Vol. III is the third compilation album by former Misfits vocalist Michale Graves. It features songs from a 2002 live performance in New Jersey.

Track listing 

2002 compilation albums
Michale Graves albums